The Moving Picture Institute (MPI) is an American non-profit organization and film production company founded in 2005 by Thor Halvorssen, who was also one of the producers for some of their movies. Its current president is Rob Pfaltzgraff.

Mission and purpose
According to the NYT The Moving Picture Institute backs pro-business, anti-Communist and anti-environmentalist movies. Halvorssen said to the NYT, the role as movie mogul aligns with his other activities, „A film can reach a lot more people than a white paper [...] What Sideways did for Pinot noir, I want to do for freedom.“

The Moving Picture Institute has publicly stated as their aim to be „a production company and talent incubator that creates high-impact films designed to entertain, inspire, and educate audiences with captivating stories about human freedom.“ For that it says, it will 1) launch filmmakers’ careers through grants and classes and 2) produce original content in-house.

MPI produces and collaborates on both fictional films and non-fictional, documentary-style films. MPI's films typically center on topics such as human rights and individual freedoms, governmental waste and corruption.

Major productions

MPI is involved in the production and promotion of the following narrative and documentary films:

References

External links
 Moving Picture Institute

Non-profit organizations based in New York City
Film production companies of the United States